"Another Year Gone" is a song by British-Norwegian boyband A1, released as a single in promotion of the Philippines tour edition of their fourth studio album, Waiting For Daylight, upon which the song features as a bonus track alongside acoustic versions of their former hits. It is the fifth overall single from the album. The single is backed with the B-side "After All It's Christmas", another seasonal track that the band premiered during a series of concerts in Oslo and Europe. No music video was produced for the track.

Track listing
 Digital download
 "Another Year Gone" - 3:55
 "After All It's Christmas" - 2:36

References

2011 singles
A1 (band) songs
Songs written by Ben Adams
Songs written by Christian Ingebrigtsen
Songs written by Mark Read (singer)
2010 songs